Under the Covers is the fourth studio album by American comedy duo Ninja Sex Party, and their first cover album. The concept for the album and title were revealed on July 28, 2015, and the album released on March 4, 2016. Unlike their previous albums, Under the Covers is composed only of covers of songs from the 1970s and 1980s and strays from the duo's traditional comedic style.

It is their first album released with Tupper Ware Remix Party as their backup band; NSP keyboardist Brian Wecht previously performed all instruments on the band's albums. On February 23, 2016, a music video was released for their cover of "Take On Me"; the video for their cover of "Everybody Wants to Rule the World" was released one week later, on March 1, 2016. The video cover of "Wish You Were Here" was released December 25, 2016. A follow-up, Under the Covers, Vol. II, was released on October 27, 2017.

Track listing

Personnel
 Ninja Sex Party
Dan Avidan – lead and backing vocals
Brian Wecht – keyboards, piano, synthesizer and programming

 Additional personnel
 Tupper Ware Remix Party – backup band
 Lord Phobos – guitar
 Commander Meouch – bass guitar
 Doctor Sung – keytar
 Havve Hogan – drums
 Super Guitar Bros – acoustic guitar ("Wish You Were Here")

Production
Bed tracks for the album were recorded by Thomas D'Arcy at Taurus Recording in Toronto, ON. The album's seventh and eleventh tracks were mixed by Dan Castellani, Jr. at Galactic Music and Audio, while the other tracks were mixed by Colin Crowell. Audio mastering for the album was completed by Kristian Montano at the Lacquer Channel Mastering recording studio, located in Toronto, Ontario. Its CD copies were manufactured and printed in Pennsauken, New Jersey by the company Disc Makers.
Jim Arsenault – producer
Brent Lilley – producer, engineering
Brian Wecht – production
Thomas D'Arcy – engineer

Charts

References

2016 albums
Ninja Sex Party albums
Covers albums